"Head Like a Hole" is a song by the American industrial rock band Nine Inch Nails, released as the second single from the group's debut album, Pretty Hate Machine.

Although one of the more rock-oriented tracks on the album, many elements of electronic and dance music are still featured. The lyrical contents deal with themes of betrayal and angst, consistent with the rest of the album.

"Head Like a Hole" is among the band's most famous songs, and remains both a critical and fan favorite. It enjoyed heavy rotation on the radio at the time of its release, eventually reaching number 9 on Billboard Bubbling Under Hot 100 chart. It has been covered by several artists, including Devo, Showbread, AFI, Korn, and even Carnifex. The song was also rewritten as "On a Roll" (performed by Miley Cyrus in character as Ashley O) for the Black Mirror episode "Rachel, Jack and Ashley Too".

Recording
Trent Reznor wrote "Head Like a Hole" in 1988, after touring with Skinny Puppy. Flood, Adrian Sherwood, and Keith LeBlanc were co-producers of the song, and it was recorded in 1989. "Head Like a Hole" was one of the last songs completed for the album, since Flood did not arrive to the studio until the completion of Depeche Mode's Violator (1990). Reznor said that the song emerged from the feel that "I needed something to kind of break the guitars out and be a bit more aggressive", while also conveying his fears that TVT Records would not be helpful to him, with the aggression turned up further by producer Keith LeBlanc after Reznor learned that the label had not liked the early version of his album.

Music and lyrics
"Head Like a Hole" has been classified as an industrial rock and electronic rock song, and recognized as an "industrial dance anthem". The tempo is 115 BPM, and it is played in the key of E Minor.

The chords of this song are similar to the project's debut single, "Down in It". In contrast to "Down in It", "Head Like a Hole" has a longer intro, lasts roughly one minute longer (the song is five minutes long in its aggregate length), is heavy metal music-oriented, and has no rapping. "Head Like a Hole" is also the opening track on Nine Inch Nails' 1989 debut album, and is one of the two Nine Inch Nails songs produced by Flood to appear on Pretty Hate Machine.

Release and reception
Labeled as "Halo 3", Head Like a Hole is the third official Nine Inch Nails release, containing remixes of three different songs from Pretty Hate Machine. The single release is longer in duration than the album itself. The single peaked at #28 on the Billboard Modern Rock Tracks chart.

A three-track version of this single was released in the UK containing "Head Like a Hole (Opal)" which is not included on the US release. This version begins with a sample of "Tamborine" by Prince, taken from his 1985 album Around the World in a Day and incorporates a drum loop sampled from "Release It" taken from another Prince record, the soundtrack to the Prince-directed movie Graffiti Bridge (1990). The saxophone in "Release It" can be heard before the drum loop begins. "Head Like a Hole (Copper)" samples the looping drum beat from "Body Language", a track off of the Hot Space (1982) album by Queen. The first track is mistakenly listed as "Head Like a Hole (Slate)" on the CD. "Down in It (Shred)" and "Down in It (Singe)" were previously released on the "Down in It" single; the latter track is extended by 18 seconds. The unlisted eleventh track is host Heather Day yelling "Let's hear it for Nine Inch Nails! Woo! They're good!" This is a sample from Dance Party USA during an appearance by the band on the show.

"Head Like a Hole" was re-issued as a single in Australia in 1995, where it peaked at #57 on the ARIA singles chart and spent 7 weeks in the top 100.

The 11-track United States version of "Head Like a Hole" has recently been repackaged and re-released. This version was also released in the United Kingdom, where it failed to reach the Top 40 Finally, in Germany, the single was released as "You Get What You Deserve". This release includes four tracks.

In a retrospective review of the song, Allmusic described "Head Like a Hole" as "grand theater", elaborating further by commenting the "backing music was immaculately crafted and produced". In its review of the single, the author was largely positive towards the song selection, even saying that the inclusion of "Head Like a Hole", "Terrible Lie", and "Down in It" "renders Pretty Hate Machine mostly unnecessary". As for the other tracks included on the single, Allmusic was less positive, adding, "This is one case where quality definitely would have sufficed without the quantity".

The single was included in the 2015 Record Store Day–Black Friday exclusive box set, Halo I–IV.

In 2020, Kerrang and Billboard ranked the song number eight and number two, respectively, on their lists of the greatest Nine Inch Nails songs.

Music video
A music video was made for the "Clay" remix of this song. Directed by Eric Zimmerman, it was released in March 1990 and again later in 1997 on the Closure VHS. The video became popular on MTV and helped fuel NIN's early success. A slightly different edit of the video was also released for Flood's remix of the song, which is 17 seconds shorter than the "Clay" remix. The video features band members Trent Reznor, Richard Patrick, and Chris Vrenna, as well as guest drummer Martin Atkins performing in a cage.

The video was filmed at the original location of Exit nightclub which was located at 1653 North Wells Street in Chicago.

The video begins with black and white footage of a person hopping on one foot while spinning a staff which fades in and out against a background of blurred colors (excerpts of Maya Deren's unfinished documentary on voodoo rituals "Divine Horsemen: The Living Gods of Haiti"). Clips of Reznor putting his head in a bucket of water, and an off-screen person using the same bucket to make Reznor wet, were taken by a video camera before filming a performance of the song from Nine Inch Nails as a live band.

The guitar Reznor uses in the video is a Jackson Dinky. It is first seen in first chorus, when Reznor, appearing to be dirty like the other band members (he had long hair and wore gritty clothing during production), bangs his head twice while singing the song. He does not use the guitar for the climax of the video, where wires tied to him slowly pull him up, leaving the frontman spinning upside down. At the same scene, Vrenna destroys his drum kit by throwing a bass drum of Atkins' drum kit towards the object. At a shot occurring prior to that point, broken Zildjian cymbals and a drum machine can be seen as parts of Vrenna's kit.

There are images that are shown for a few frames like "HEAD", "16 SOUND START", "S M P T E UNIVERSAL LEADER" and "PICTURE". Other images included a white dot set against a black background, a mirrored presentation showing the words "REEL № PROD № PLAY DATE" colored in yellow, one with the words "PICTURE START", and a frame consisting of "C C F F" placed near an outlined ring. The latter screen had an alternative version that was accompanied by a white number 3, also seen in the video. There are also visuals of four incomplete rotating mechanical models of human heads; one with film stills, another with a modified motherboard and other technology, the purple, wired, head with a blue screen showing an eye and various computer hardware, and the last containing blue skin, orange-pupil eyes, and a lightbulb. The former two were filmed in black and white, while the latter two in full color. All four are shown intercut with shots of people spinning baseball bats.

Live performances

The song has been the encore for most NIN shows (especially the Pretty Hate Machine Tour Series), or the last song before the encore if an encore took place. There are live videos of "Head Like a Hole" on the DVDs And All That Could Have Been and Beside You in Time.

During Lollapalooza '91, Dave Navarro, Eric Avery, Gibby Haynes and Ice-T joined Nine Inch Nails live performances on-stage as additional guitarists for "Head Like a Hole;" except for the first show in Phoenix, AZ when NIN walked off stage after the first song in a snit.
For the Nights of Nothing mini-tour in 1996, Richard Patrick made a brief return to the band to perform guitar and vocals on "Head Like a Hole" at the Irving Plaza show in New York along with Clint Mansell, who joined NIN on this song at all three shows of the tour.
In the June 7, 2006 radio performance at Atlanta, Georgia, Trent Reznor and Peter Murphy played a reworked version of "Head Like a Hole".

Lisa Kennedy Montgomery once sang the song loudly to Reznor to win a $20 bet. To express the evolving state of his values, Reznor said in 1997 that "I don't want to be singing "Head Like a Hole" at age 50."

Legacy
Since its commercial maxi-single release, "Head Like a Hole" continues to generate an impact on other musicians and bands. New Zealand-based grunge band HLAH is named after the song. The name is sometimes abbreviated to avoid copyright infringement issues.

"Head Like a Hole" is the most widely covered Nine Inch Nails song. In 2005, The String Quartet Tribute released a cover album of reworked versions of Pretty Hate Machine, including "Head Like a Hole". Other bands who covered the track include punk rock band AFI, rock artist Ryan Star, new wave band Devo, indie rock band Honest Bob and the Factory-to-Dealer Incentives, gothic metal band Lullacry, nu metal band Korn, post-industrial band PIG, hard rock band Buckcherry, Christian rock band Showbread, and Miley Cyrus as Ashley O for the 2019 television series Black Mirror.

"Head Like a Hole" was part of a controversy after the September 11 attacks, when Clear Channel Communications placed it in a 2001 list of post-9/11 inappropriate song titles not for radio airplay.

The track was also featured as number 37 on PopMatters "The 100 Greatest Alternative Singles of the ‘80s" list.

American deathcore act Carnifex did a cover of the song on their EP Bury Me In Blasphemy.

"Head Like a Hole", among other Nine Inch Nails songs, was remixed and rewritten by Charlie Brooker with Reznor's approval as the pop song "On a Roll" for the fifth series episode "Rachel, Jack and Ashley Too" of Black Mirror. The song was released as a single on June 14, 2019. At the end of the episode, Cyrus performed a cover version of "Head Like a Hole".

The song was used in the television advertising campaign for the action video game Gears of War 5.

Track listing

US version

UK version

Australian version

"You Get What You Deserve" German promo

Releases
 TVT Records TVT 2614 – US 12" Vinyl
 TVT Records TVT 2615-2 – US CD
 Island Records 12 IS 484 878 893-1 – UK 12" Vinyl
 Island Records CID 482 878 893-2 – UK CD
 Island Records 663 875 – German promo CD

Rock Band 3 
It was made available to download on March 1, 2011, for use in the Rock Band 3 music gaming platform in both Basic rhythm, and PRO mode which utilizes real guitar / bass guitar, and MIDI compatible electronic drum kits / keyboards in addition to vocals.

Charts

Weekly charts

Year-end charts

References

External links

halo three at nin.com, the official website
Head Like a Hole at the NinWiki
halo three at NIN Collector

Nine Inch Nails songs
1989 songs
1990 singles
Song recordings produced by Flood (producer)
Song recordings produced by Keith LeBlanc
Song recordings produced by Adrian Sherwood
Songs written by Trent Reznor
TVT Records singles
Song recordings produced by Trent Reznor